Real Wheels, also known as There Goes A..., is a series of children's educational videos for ages 3–8 that features a specified vehicle and the different jobs that it has along with real people who work the job which requires the vehicle. Episodes like There Goes a Garbage Truck, There Goes the Mail and There Goes a Rescue Vehicle, were released as a part of the Dream Big series. Each episode focuses on different modes of transport, though one episode is reserved for Santa Claus and another for roller coasters. Each is live-action, starring Dave Hood who is sometimes accompanied by Becky Borg. Dave Hood does not appear in There Goes a Farm Truck, There Goes a Tractor and There Goes a Dump Truck, in which he is replaced by David Sidoni.

Plot
The series of videos revolved around Dave (sometimes with Becky) in jobs that focus around the vehicles being featured. Dave and Becky always reminded kids that they did not have the respective jobs, but the real workers had agreed for them to pretend for the day so that the viewers could learn about the vehicles and a little more about the jobs they serve. While the most part of the videos focused on showing how the vehicles worked and what they can do, some episodes also featured a trope where Dave would predictably get into trouble (example: accidentally knocking down a building in There Goes a Bulldozer) and deliver his catchphrase, "I shouldn't have done that!". Becky would sometimes get into the same trouble caused by Dave.

In these videos, the hosts talked about how the vehicles worked, the history of the vehicle featured and talked to real people who worked in their fields. At the end of each episode, Dave and/or Becky would encourage the viewers to visit their local library or the place based on the theme's episode to learn more about the vehicles. On other episodes, at the end, Dave and Becky would also remind the viewers about safety (such as "don't play on the railroad tracks" in There Goes a Train and "don't play with fire" in There Goes a Fire Truck). Other times, the people who worked in the fields of the vehicles would discuss safety to the viewers as well. Some episodes are hosted by Dave Sidoni.

Locations
The majority of the episodes were filmed on location in southern California at locations such as Union Station, Ontario International Airport, the Los Angeles County Sheriff's Department, Six Flags Magic Mountain, the Metro Headquarters Building, the Getty Museum and Camp Pendleton. They were occasionally filmed at places like the Kennedy Space Center, the Pacific Southwest Railway Museum and the USS Kitty Hawk.

List of episodes

Rockin' Real Wheels
A spin-off known as Rockin' Real Wheels was also released featuring songs about the specific types of vehicles featured in the main series. There are four episodes in this series.

1. Train Songs

Two kids named Michael and Jennifer visit the Pacific Southwest Railway Museum to learn all about trains. Along the way, they meet Tuffy the train in a musical train adventure.

2. Bulldozer Songs

Two kids named Winnie and Alex meet Rocky the bulldozer as he takes them to learn all about bulldozers and other construction vehicles and how they work through song.

3. Fire Truck Songs

During an open house at the fire department, two kids named Jessica and Jay meet Freddy the Friendly Fire Engine as they embark on a musical journey learning all about fire trucks. Along the way, the kids learn about the various types of tools and equipment the firefighters use as well as various fire safety guidelines. Various songs are used to entertain the kids.

4. Santa Claus Songs

One day, at the library, three kids named Leslie, Leon, and Julie open a magical Christmas book and an animated Santa Claus takes them on a musical holiday journey to the North Pole. Note: This episode stars then-future All That star Leon Frierson.

DVD releases

The "Real Wheels" series has also released a series of DVD, each usually containing two episodes as well as a blooper reel, interactive glossary, and other special features. The DVDs are usually titled as "Adventures", with three episodes sharing a theme among their featured vehicles. A spin-off called "Rockin' Real Wheels" was also released featuring songs about a specific type of vehicle. All episodes except for Here Comes a Roller Coaster, There Goes Santa Claus, and Santa Songs were featured on DVD.

"Adventures" DVDs
1. Truck Adventures

There Goes a Fire Truck, There Goes a Garbage Truck, and There Goes a Truck.

2. Mega Truck Adventures

There Goes a Bulldozer, There Goes a Monster Truck, and There Goes a Tank.

3. High Speed Adventures

There Goes a Race Car, There Goes a Motorcycle, and There Goes a Spaceship.

4. Travel Adventures

There Goes a Train, There Goes a Plane, and There Goes a Bus.

5. Land, Sea, and Air Adventures

There Goes a Boat, There Goes the Mail, and There Goes a Helicopter.

6. Tractor Adventures

There Goes a Tractor, There Goes a Dump Truck, and There Goes a Farm Truck.

7. Rescue Adventures

There Goes a Rescue Hero, There Goes a Police Car, and There Goes a Rescue Vehicle.

8. Rockin' Real Wheels

Train Songs, Bulldozer Songs, and Fire Truck Songs.

Live tour

From 2001-2004, there was a live tour entitled, "Real Wheels Live". It starred Dave Hood that featured him doing magic tricks and had audience participation stunts. Before the show, there were vehicles that the audience would touch and look at.

References

1990s American children's television series
2000s American children's television series
1993 American television series debuts
2003 American television series endings
American children's education television series
PBS Kids shows
PBS original programming